Frengky Pare Kogoya (born June 22, 1997) is an Indonesian professional footballer who plays as a midfielder.

Honours

Club
Persija Jakarta
 Liga 1: 2018

References

External links 
 Frengky Kogoya at Liga Indonesia
 Frengky Kogoya at Soccerway

1997 births
Living people
Badak Lampung F.C. players
Persipura Jayapura players
Persija Jakarta players
Liga 1 (Indonesia) players
Indonesian footballers
Association football wingers
Yahukimo F.C. players
PSPS Riau players
Muba Babel United F.C. players
People from Wamena